Fahad Mosaed al-Muwallad  (born 14 September 1994) is a Saudi Arabian professional footballer who currently plays as a winger for Al-Shabab.

He started his professional career with Al-Ittihad when he was only 16 years old. On 31 July 2011 he scored the second goal for Saudi Arabia against Croatia in the 2011 U-20 World Cup in Colombia, which marked his first ever international goal at age 16. In 2012 while playing for Al-Ittihad, he entered the match as a substitute in the last 10 minutes and scored the winning goal against Guangzhou Evergrande F.C. to qualify with his team to AFC Champions League Semi-finals. With Saudi Arabia, he scored the winning goal against China in Asian Cup qualifications. Additionally and most notably he also scored the goal which sent Saudi Arabia to the 2018 World Cup in Russia, and is known for having the top speed of any Asian player ever.

Early life and breakthrough
Fahad Al-Muwallad was born in Jeddah, Saudi Arabia and from a very early age he became well known as a prominent footballing talent in the local area. He was then approached by a Barcelona scout after seeing him put in a good amount of great performances. He rejected the offer then went on to join the Al-Ittihad youth team from the age of 6, he worked his way up the ranks and started to gain national media attention when he started training with the first-team squad at the age of just 15 years. On 7 February 2012, at just 16-years-old, Fahad al-Muwallad made his professional début against Al-Raed. After playing more matches regularly in the Saudi Professional League, Fahad became renowned for his blistering pace and his superb technical ability while showing brilliant composure in front of goal.

Club career

Al-Ittihad

2012–13 season
Fahad continued to impress and on 2 August 2012, Fahad scored his first professional goal against Al-Raed in a 2–2 draw. During the 2012/13 season, Fahad started to become known as one of biggest talents in Asian football, after scoring many goals for Al-Ittihad from the wing. Fahad then grew further international attention when, at the age of just 17 years, he scored the all decisive goal in the quarter-final of the prestigious AFC Champions League against Marcelo Lippi's Guangzhou Evergrande that sent Al-Ittihad into the semi-finals. Fahad also lit up the Champions Cup where he, first, scored in Al-Ittihad's semi-final victory over Al-Fateh and then he scored in the final in a 4–2 victory over Al-Shabab played in front of over 50,000 at the King Fahd International Stadium. Fahad was later voted the Champions Cup MVP (Most Valuable Player) due to his memorizing performances on the football field throughout the tournament. Fahad finished the 2012/13 season with an impressive 10 goals in 26 games in all competitions.

2013–14 season
Fahad opened his account for the new season in the Saudi El Clasico in dramatic fashion, putting Al-Ittihad ahead after a clever through ball from Saud Kariri. However Al-Ittihad went on to lose the match 5–2 at the King Fahd International Stadium but Fahad's performance was praised by Al-Ittihad manager Beñat San José and pundits alike. Fahad then scored in a vital match against Al-Ettifaq, opening proceedings with a powerful drive into the top left-hand corner of the net, leaving Al-Ettifaq goalkeeper Mohammad Sharifi motionless. However the game ended in disappointment for Al-Ittihad as Hasan Kadesh equalised for Al-Ettifaq, resulting in the game finishing in a 1–1 draw. Fahad also heavily impressed in the AFC Champions League against some of the best teams throughout the whole of Asia. On 13 May 2014, Fahad scored 2 wonderful goals in a crucial last 16 tie against fellow Saudi outfit Al-Shabab played at the King Fahd International Stadium. After a clever reverse pass from Mukhtar Fallatah, Fahad ran onto the pass with excessive pace, beat the keeper to the ball and then poked the ball past him to send the crowd into raptures. Fahad then claimed his second goal of the match scoring an exquisite chip over Al-Shabab goalkeeper Waleed Abdullah. Al-Ittihad went on the win 3–1. Fahad ended the season with 5 goals in 36 appearances in all competitions. Fahad was praised by Al-Ittihad manager Khalid Al Koroni for improving his game this season by gaining more assists and described Fahad as an "extraordinary talent".

2014–15 season
Fahad scored his first goal of the new campaign in a 2–1 victory over Al-Faisaly played at the King Abdul Aziz Stadium because construction work was still being done on Al-Ittihad's new stadium King Abdullah Sports City Stadium which is set to hold a capacity of over 60,000. On 17 October 2014, Fahad scored the winning goal in a 2–1 win over Al-Khaleej firing the ball past the near post of Al-Khaleej goalkeeper Moslem Freej. This was Fahad's first goal at the newly built King Abdullah Sports City Stadium. On 21 March 2015, Fahad scored against Al-Khaleej with a perfectly timed header to beat goalkeeper Moslem Freej. On 9 April 2015, Fahad scored a penalty which turned out to be the decisive goal in a 1–0 triumph over Hajer, Fahad expertly fired his penalty in the top left-hand corner of the net past the out-stretched hand of former Al-Ittihad goalkeeper Mustafa Malayekah. On 22 April 2015, in the last 16 of the Champions Cup, Fahad came off the bench to fire two late goals past Al-Fateh in a 4–1 victory played at the Prince Abdullah bin Jalawi Stadium. Al-Ittihad manager Victor Pițurcă described Fahad's late goals as "heroic" and said "Fahad is making improvements everyday, if he keeps on playing as he is, he will go far, he has the world at his feet". 27 April 2015, Fahad scored a magical goal in Al-Ittihad's 4–3 victory over Al-Taawon. In the 25th minute of the game, Jamal Bajandouh squared the ball to Fahad at the edge of the area, Fahad then touched it up and hit a ferocious Bicycle kick that flew past Al-Taawon goalkeeper Sultan Al-Ghamdi into the back of the net. Fahad also scored a penalty in the same game where he expertly sent Sultan Al-Ghamdi in the wrong direction while placing the ball in the other side of the net. On 15 May 2015, Fahad scored another wonderful goal in the "Derby of Jeddah" scoring the opening goal in the 84th minute after cutting inside and striking a thunderous shot into the top right-hand corner of the net past the helpless Abdullah Al-Maiouf in the Al-Ahli net. However Salman Al-Moasher truck a late equaliser in the 89th minute to tie up proceedings, the match finished 1–1. On 31 May 2015, Fahad scored in the Saudi El Clasico, in the semi-finals of the Champions Cup at the King Fahd International Stadium, firing in a goal from the penalty spot, cancelling out the opening goal from Al-Hilal defender Digão. However the match ended in disappointment for Al-Ittihad as they capitulated with the match ending in a 4–1 win victory to Al-Hilal. Fahad ended the 2014/15 season with 10 goals in 24 appearances, while gaining praise from pundits for some extraordinary performances in Saudi Professional League and the Champions Cup.

International career
In May 2018, he was named in Saudi Arabia's preliminary squad for the 2018 World Cup in Russia. However, his performance in the World Cup was considered to be a deep disappointment, due to his incapability and his silence in important moments. Saudi Arabia eventually crashed out in the group stage, having lost 0–5 to Russia and 0–1 to Uruguay.

In 2022, he was withdrawn from the Saudi Arabia 2022 FIFA World Cup squad over a doping case.

Career statistics

Club

International
Statistics accurate as of match played 6 November 2022.

International goals
Scores and results list Saudi Arabia's goal tally first.

Honours
Al Ittihad
Kings Cup: 2013
Crown Prince Cup: 2016–17
Saudi Super Cup runner-up: 2013, 2018

Individual
King Cup of Champions Most Valuable Player: 2013

References

External links

1994 births
Living people
Sportspeople from Jeddah
Association football wingers
Saudi Arabian footballers
Saudi Professional League players
La Liga players
Ittihad FC players
Levante UD footballers
Al-Shabab FC (Riyadh) players
2015 AFC Asian Cup players
2019 AFC Asian Cup players
Saudi Arabia youth international footballers
Saudi Arabia international footballers
Saudi Arabian expatriate footballers
Saudi Arabian expatriate sportspeople in Spain
Expatriate footballers in Spain
2018 FIFA World Cup players
Saudi Arabian sportspeople in doping cases
Doping cases in association football